The Widefield School District 3 is a public school district serving parts of western El Paso County, Colorado, United States. It primarily serves Security-Widefield, but it also serves southeastern Colorado Springs, which is where the district office is located.

List of schools

Preschools 
 Widefield Preschool - Formerly North Elementary School in 2011-2012 school year

Elementary schools
French Elementary
King Elementary
North Elementary - repurposed as a preschool starting in the 2011-2012 school year
Pinello Elementary 
Sunrise Elementary 
Talbott Elementary 
Venetucci Elementary
Widefield Elementary
Webster Elementary

A former school, the S.A. Wilson Elementary School in Security-Widefield, built in 1959-61, was listed on the National Register of Historic Places in 2017.  It was one of six elementary schools in Widefield School District built during 1954 to 1961, during which the district grew from 125 students to more than 3,500 students.  The building later became the S.A. Wilson Center, hosting several school district resources.

Junior high schools
Janitell Junior High
Sproul Junior High
Watson Junior High
Grand Mountain K-8

High schools
Discovery High School, Widefield
Mesa Ridge High School
Widefield High School
D3 My Way K-12 Virtual School

Charter
 James Madison Charter Academy

See also
List of school districts in Colorado

References

External links

School districts in Colorado
Education in El Paso County, Colorado
School districts established in 1874
1874 establishments in Colorado Territory